Sean Rice (July 20, 1972 – January 14, 2022) was a Canadian pair skater who also competed in the fours discipline. With Jodeyne Higgins, he was the 1995 Skate Canada International bronze medalist, the 1992 Nebelhorn Trophy bronze medalist, and a two-time (1993, 1995) Canadian national bronze medallist. He was also a four-time (1993–1996) Canadian fours champion.

Career 
Competing in pairs, Higgins and Rice won bronze at the 1992 Nebelhorn Trophy and at the 1993 Canadian Nationals. They were assigned to the 1993 World Championships where they placed 10th. The following season was less successful for the pair. They finished 6th at Nationals and were not sent to Worlds. After winning bronze at the 1995 Canadian Championships, they obtained a second trip to Worlds and finished 14th. The pair never reached the podium again at Nationals but they won bronze at the 1995 Skate Canada International.

Competing in fours at the Canadian Championships, Higgins and Rice won gold medals with Scott MacDonald and Alison Purkiss (1994–1996), and Jodi Barnes and Rob Williams (1993). They also won the 1992 bronze medal with Janice Yeck and Scott MacDonald and the 1997 silver medal with Melissa Shields and Trevor Buttenham.

After retiring from competitive skating, Higgins and Rice toured professionally on Royal Caribbean Cruise Lines. In 2011, Rice participated in ITV1's Dancing on Ice, partnered with British TV presenter Angela Rippon. In 2012, Rice was partnered with British Olympic skier Chemmy Alcott.

Personal life and death 
Higgins and Rice were married and had a daughter, Signey, born in October 2013. Rice died on January 14, 2022, at the age of 49.

Competitive highlights

Pairs with Higgins

Fours with Higgins and others

Earlier partnerships 
(with Sherry Ball)

(with Kimberly Thomson)

References

External links
 Pairs on Ice: Jodeyne Higgins & Sean Rice

1972 births
2022 deaths
Canadian male pair skaters
Sportspeople from Oakville, Ontario
20th-century Canadian people
21st-century Canadian people